Logan Cunningham may refer to:

Logan Cunningham (coach) (1887–1964), American football coach
Logan Cunningham (athlete) (born 1991), American pole vaulter
Logan Cunningham (actor), American actor known for his work in the video game industry